Michael Nike Gómez Vega (born 4 April 1997) is a Colombian footballer who plays as a striker for Envigado F.C.

References

1997 births
Living people
Colombian footballers
Categoría Primera A players
Envigado F.C. players
Sportspeople from Santander Department
Colombia youth international footballers
Colombia under-20 international footballers
Association football forwards